Nobody's Got It All is the eighteenth studio album by country music artist John Anderson released under the Columbia Records label on March 27, 2001. The album produced the singles "Nobody's Got It All" which peaked at 55 on the country charts and "You Ain't Hurt Nothin' Yet", which peaked at 56. Also included on the album was a cover of Bruce Springsteen's 1982 song Atlantic City from his album Nebraska.

According to Allmusic, Anderson's vocals are best utilized in the album on "the ballads, which prominently feature steel guitar and fiddle in traditional country style." His voice is described as "vulnerable, slightly wheezy tenor" that is best suited for "slow material." The reviewer states that some of the tracks are "conservative reflections" on life. Anderson's voice is compared by the reviewer to Levon Helm.

The album was produced by Blake Chancey and Paul Worley, who were a popular production team at the end of the 1990s, most notable for their work with the Dixie Chicks.

"It Ain't Easy Being Me" was previously recorded by Chris Knight on his self-titled album. "The Big Revival" was later recorded by Montgomery Gentry on Back When I Knew It All, which was also produced by Chancey. The song was later recorded by Kenny Chesney in 2014 and used as the title track of his album The Big Revival.

Track listing
"You Ain't Hurt Nothin' Yet" (Al Anderson, Billy Lawson) - 3:51
"It Ain't Easy Being Me" (Chris Knight, Craig Wiseman) - 3:50
"I Ain't Afraid of Dying" (John Anderson, Dean Dillon) - 3:32
"Nobody's Got It All" (Layng Martine, Jr., Kent Robbins) - 3:44
"The Call" (Eric Heatherly, Michael White) - 4:38
"Appalachian Blue" (Donna Anderson, Michael Anderson) - 3:43
"The Big Revival" (Dennis Linde) - 3:16
"Go to Town" (J. Anderson, Dillon) - 4:17
"Five Generations of Rock County Wilsons" (John Scott Sherrill) - 3:51
"Baby's Gone Home to Mama" (Shawn Camp, Herb McCullough) - 3:20
"I Love You Again" (J. Anderson, Wiseman) - 3:51
"Atlantic City" (Bruce Springsteen) - 4:47

Personnel
Al Anderson - acoustic guitar
John Anderson - lead vocals, background vocals
Joe Chemay - bass guitar, background vocals
Chad Cromwell - drums
Dan Dugmore - steel guitar
David Grissom - electric guitar
John Hobbs - keyboards
Jim Horn - baritone saxophone, horn arrangements
Liana Manis - background vocals
Terry McMillan - percussion, harmonica
Steve Nathan - keyboards
Steve Patrick - trumpet
Charles Rose - trombone
Joe Spivey - banjo, fiddle, mandolin
Harry Stinson - background vocals
Harvey Thompson - tenor saxophone
Paul Worley - acoustic guitar, electric guitar

Chart performance

Singles

References

2001 albums
Columbia Records albums
John Anderson (musician) albums
Albums produced by Paul Worley
Albums produced by Blake Chancey